CD244 (Cluster of Differentiation 244) is a human protein encoded by the  gene. It is also known as Natural Killer Cell Receptor 2B4

This gene encodes a cell surface receptor expressed on natural killer cells (NK cells) (and some T cells) mediating non-major histocompatibility complex (MHC) restricted killing. The interaction between NK-cell and target cells via this receptor is thought to modulate NK-cell cytolytic activity. Alternatively spliced transcript variants encoding different isoforms have been found for this gene.
CD244 can also be expressed on non-lymphocytes such as eosinophils, mast cells and dendritic cells.

See also
 Cluster of differentiation

References

Further reading

External links
 
 

Clusters of differentiation